"Planet Earth" is the debut single by the British pop rock band Duran Duran, released on 2 February 1981.

It was an immediate hit in the band's native UK, reaching #12 on the UK Singles Chart on 21 February, and did even better in Australia, hitting #8 to become Duran Duran's first Top 10 hit anywhere in the world.

The song later appeared on the band's eponymous debut album Duran Duran, released in June 1981.

About the song
"Planet Earth" begins with a mid-tempo synthesised sweep backed with sequenced electronic rhythm, but the real rhythm section of throbbing bass and crisp drums soon kick in.  Muted guitar carries the up-and-down throbbing as the singer joins in.

The sequenced part on this song is a Prophet-5 synth, while a Roland Jupiter-4 and a Crumar Performer were used for strings and other sounds. The flanging intro sound was the Jupiter 4 processed by an MXR flanger.

Record World described the song as being a "simple, catchy cut" with "a flexible bass [that] sets the consistent, throbbing pulse" and "mechanistic keyboard lines."

The song was the first to explicitly acknowledge the fledgling New Romantic fashion movement, with the line "Like some New Romantic looking for the TV sound".

The original demo had an extra verse at the end, as can be heard in the Manchester Square Demo version, released in 2009:

"I came outside I saw the nightfall with the rain,
Sheet lightning flashes in my brain,
Whatever happened to the world we used to know?
I've got you coming over fear now."

Music video
The music video for the song was directed by future film director Russell Mulcahy, who would go on to direct a dozen more for the group.

Fairly primitive by the band's later standards, the video features the band (dressed in New Romantic fashions) playing the song on a white stage tricked out with special effects to look like a platform made of ice or crystal.  Interspersed with the performance are shots of the band members alongside the four elements.  The video focused closely on the band's faces. The instrumental middle section features two friends of the band from the Rum Runner nightclub nicknamed Gay John and Lavinya dancing in their full New Romantic regalia. In an apocalyptic science-fiction style, various world facts slide cross the bottom of the screen as the video plays, including: "the area of the surface of the earth is 196,937,600 miles"; "247,860 people are born every day"; "the oldest known song is the Shadoof Chant"; and then it ends with a warning of "Doomsday." At the end of the video, singer Simon Le Bon leaps from the stage, caught in a freeze frame shot above an apparently bottomless abyss.

The video was recreated in the music video for The Dandy Warhols' "You Were the Last High" (which was produced by Nick Rhodes, the band's keyboardist).

B-sides, bonus tracks and remixes
For most countries, the B-side track for the "Planet Earth" 45 is a concert favourite called "Late Bar" which was one of the earliest songs Duran Duran had written together after their classic Le Bon/Rhodes/Taylor/Taylor/Taylor line-up had solidified. However, the B-side track for the North American release of "Planet Earth" is "To the Shore".

Beginning with "Planet Earth", Duran Duran began creating what they called "night versions" for each of their songs; extended versions that were featured on their 12-inch singles. Back in 1981, the technology to do extended remixes was still quite rudimentary, so the band chose instead to create a new arrangement of the song, loosely based on the version they were playing live at the time. This formed the basis for the "night version".

The "Night Version" of "Planet Earth" appeared in place of the original on some early American releases of the Duran Duran album.

In addition to the 12", the night version of "Planet Earth" was included on the EPs Nite Romantics and Carnival.

For the 1999 remix album Strange Behaviour, EMI inadvertently unearthed unreleased alternative mixes of both "Planet Earth" and "Hold Back the Rain".

The alternative mix of "Planet Earth" which is called "Night Mix" also appears on the special edition of Duran Duran's first album, released in 2010.

Formats and track listing

7": EMI. / EMI 5137 United Kingdom
 "Planet Earth" – 3:59
 "Late Bar" – 2:54

12": EMI. / 12 EMI 5137 United Kingdom
 "Planet Earth (Night Version)" – 6:18
 "Planet Earth" – 3:59
 "Late Bar" – 2:54

CD: Part of "Singles Box Set 1981-1985" boxset
 "Planet Earth" – 3:59
 "Late Bar" – 2:54
 "Planet Earth (Night Version)" – 6:18

CD: Part of Duran Duran 2010 Special Edition (CD2) 
 "Planet Earth (Night Mix)" – 7:00

 Released in 2010
 This rare alternative version can also be found on the Strange Behaviour remix album, released in 1999.

Charts

Weekly charts

Year-end charts

As of October 2021 "Planet Earth" is the ninth most streamed Duran Duran song in the UK.

Other appearances
Apart from the single, "Planet Earth" has also appeared on:

Albums:
 Duran Duran (1981)
 Carnival (1982)
 Arena (1984)
 Decade (1989)
 Night Versions: The Essential Duran Duran (1998)
 Greatest (1998)
 Strange Behaviour (1999)
 Singles Box Set 1981-1985 (2005)
 A Diamond in the Mind: Live 2011 (2011)

Personnel
 Simon Le Bon – lead vocals and backing vocals
 Andy Taylor – electric guitar and backing vocals
 John Taylor – bass and backing vocals
 Roger Taylor – electronic drums
 Nick Rhodes – synthesizers and programming

References

External links
 Official site
 Nunos's Duran Duran homepage
 Duran Duran Timeline: 1981
 Duran Duran CZ

1981 debut singles
Duran Duran songs
Music videos directed by Russell Mulcahy
Song recordings produced by Colin Thurston
1980 songs
EMI Records singles
Songs written by Simon Le Bon
Songs written by John Taylor (bass guitarist)
Songs written by Roger Taylor (Duran Duran drummer)
Songs written by Andy Taylor (guitarist)
Songs written by Nick Rhodes